Denarat (also Romanized as Denārat, Danārat, and Denārt) is a village in Keraj Rural District, in the Central District of Isfahan County, Isfahan Province, Iran. At the 2006 census, its population was 2,243, in 559 families.

References 

Populated places in Isfahan County